Miami University Press is a university press affiliated with Miami University in Oxford, Ohio. The press specializes in works of poetry, fiction, and those that detail the history of Miami University. Miami University Press was founded in 1992 by Miami University English professor James Reiss. It currently hosts an annual "Miami University Press Novella" contest.

See also

 List of English-language book publishing companies
 List of university presses

References

External links 
Miami University Press

Miami University Press
Ohio